Guðjón Finnbogason (2 December 1927 – 26 February 2017) was an Icelandic footballer. He played in 16 matches for the Iceland national football team from 1953 to 1958.

References

External links
 

1927 births
2017 deaths
Gudjon Finnbogason
Gudjon Finnbogason
Place of birth missing
Association football midfielders
Íþróttabandalag Akraness players
Icelandic football managers
Íþróttabandalag Akraness managers